Ruth Anderson (March 21, 1928 – November 29, 2019) was an American composer, orchestrator, teacher, and flutist.

Biography 
Evelyn Ruth Anderson was born March 21, 1928, in Kalispell, Montana. She was a composer of orchestral and electronic music. Her extensive education spanned two decades, and was spent at eight different institutions. Throughout this time, Anderson was the recipient of a multitude of awards and grants, including two Fulbright awards (1958–60) to study composition with Darius Milhaud and Nadia Boulanger in Paris. After completing her education, Anderson spent time as a freelance composer, orchestrator, and choral arranger for NBC-TV, and later for Lincoln Center Theater.

Post-secondary education 
 1949 — Bachelor of Arts, magna cum laude, University of Washington
 1951 — Master of Arts, University of Washington
 1958–60 — studied with Darius Milhaud and with Nadia Boulanger at The American School at Fontainebleau
 1962–63 — Princeton University Graduate School (one of the first four women admitted)
 1965, 1966, 1969 — Columbia–Princeton Electronic Music Center (today, the Computer Music Center)

She was a "respected electronic composer" whose works have been released on the Opus One label, Charles Amirkhanian's "pioneering" LP anthology New Music for Electronic and Recorded Media (1977), New World/CRI, Arch Records, and Experimental Intermedia (XI). Further work was released on Arc Light in 2020.

Compositions 
Anderson composed for a wealth of instruments and ensembles, including orchestra and electronic music.
Her sound poem I Come Out of Your Sleep (revised and recorded on Sinopah 1997 XI) is constructed from whispered phonemes extracted from Louise Bogan's poem "Little Lobelia." According to the composer "a very soft dynamic level is an integral component of this piece. It is important to listen to it in the way it was composed, near the threshold of hearing." Her collage piece SUM (State of the Union Message) is included on the Lesbian American Composers collection (1973 Opus One, reissued 1998 CRI: 780). SUM and DUMP  (1970), also a sonic collage, are her best known pieces. She called her study of Zen, begun in 1990, "a natural extension of my music," and cited as influential, especially on her interest in music and healing, composers Pauline Oliveros and Annea Lockwood.

Anderson received degrees in flute and composition at the University of Washington and later studied with Darius Milhaud and Nadia Boulanger in the 1950s and with Vladimir Ussachevsky and Pril Smiley in the 1960s at the Columbia-Princeton Electronic Music Center. She wrote that after her exposure to tape manipulation she became open to the potential of, "all sounds...as material for music". She joined the staff at Hunter College (CUNY) in 1966 and created the Electronic Music Studio there, retiring in 1988.

Just before her death in November 2019, Anderson approved the test pressings for an LP of her work, entitled Here and released by Arc Light Editions in February 2020. Included are: ‘I Come Out Of Your Sleep’; ‘SUM’ (which uses TV advertisement samples to mimic a speech by President Richard Nixon); 'Pregnant Dream' (a collaboration with poet May Swenson); ‘Points’ (constructed entirely from sine-waves); and the electro-acoustic 'So What'.

Anderson composed dozens of pieces for a variety of groups; below are some selections of her works.

References

External links
Andreu, Montse. "Innovative Women Composers"
Gann, Kyle. "List of Women Composers".
Lockwood, Annea. Hearing a Person—Remembering Ruth Anderson (1928–2019), "NewMusicBox".
Tyranny, "Blue" Gene. [ "I come out of your sleep"], All Music.

1928 births
2019 deaths
University of Washington alumni
Columbia University alumni
Princeton University alumni
Hunter College faculty
American LGBT musicians
Lesbian composers
LGBT people from Montana
American women composers
21st-century American composers
Pupils of Darius Milhaud
American women in electronic music
21st-century American women musicians
21st-century women composers
20th-century American LGBT people
21st-century LGBT people